Pardomima phaeoparda is a moth in the family Crambidae. It was described by Edward L. Martin in 1955. It is found in the Democratic Republic of the Congo (East Kasai), Ivory Coast, Nigeria and Sierra Leone.

References

Moths described in 1955
Spilomelinae